Hispar may refer to:
Hispar village
Hispar Glacier - one of the largest glaciers outside polar region
Hispar Muztagh - a sub-range of the Karakoram mountain range.
Hispar Pass (or Hispar La) - a high-altitude, non-technical mountain pass in the Karakoram Range in Pakistan.
Hispar River - the river that forms from the melt water of the Hispar Glacier
Hispar Valley - is the last Valley of Nagar Valley in the Gilgit-Baltistan region of Pakistan